Dotdash Meredith (formerly About.com) is an American digital media company based in New York City. The company publishes online articles and videos about various subjects across categories including health, home, food, finance, tech, beauty, lifestyle, travel, and education. It operates brands including Verywell, Investopedia, The Balance, Byrdie, MyDomaine, Brides, The Spruce, Simply Recipes, Serious Eats, Liquor.com, Lifewire, TripSavvy, TreeHugger, and ThoughtCo. In August 2012, About.com became a property of IAC, owner of Ask.com and numerous other online brands, and its revenue is generated by advertising. In addition to its Manhattan headquarters, Dotdash Meredith maintains offices elsewhere in the New York metropolitan area, as well as in Des Moines, Iowa, and Birmingham, Alabama.

History

1997–2005: launch, renaming, Primedia acquisition
Founded in 1996 as The Mining Company, the site was launched on April 21, 1997, by Scott Kurnit, owner of General Internet, Bill Day, and a group of other entrepreneurs in New York City. The original goal was to maintain 1,800 topic areas, but after five years of operation, this number was reduced to around 700.

The company changed its name to "About Inc.", and the website address from "miningco.com" to "about.com" in May 1999. The company was acquired by Primedia, Inc., in 2000 through a deal valued at US$690 million, whereby Primedia swapped 45.2 million shares for About, Inc.'s 18.1 million shares. At the time of the acquisition announcement, About Inc. was measured at US$133 million in cash and no debt (Sept. 30, 2000), while the Media Metrix company tallied 21 million unique monthly visitors—making it the seventh-most-visited "network of sites" at the time—a network of over 700 topic sites, sorted into 36 areas and 50,000 subjects, and approximately 4,000 advertisers. Following the purchase, which was finalized in the first quarter of 2001, the combined company was called "Primedia" and Kurnit remained chief executive officer (CEO).

2005–2012: Times Co. acquisition, Abang.com, About en Español
In February 2005, The New York Times Company (Times Co.) announced it was buying About.com, a purchase that was completed in the first half of the year for US$410 million. Google and Yahoo! were reportedly among the other bidders. Following the Times Co. acquisition, Peter C. Horan was appointed as About Inc.'s president and CEO, but he was soon replaced by Scott Meyer in May 2005.

In March 2007, About.com's patronage was measured at 33.5 million unique visitors. On May 7, 2007, About Inc. acquired ConsumerSearch.com—a site that generated 3 million unique monthly visitors during the first quarter of 2007—for US$33 million in cash following two other purchases that were made in the preceding eight-month period: UCompareHealthCare.com and Calorie-Count.com.

Initially conceived of in January 2007, About.com's first fully owned foreign venture, the China-based Abang.com, debuted in December 2007. At the time of the launch, the company had a Japan-based online entity, Allabout.co.jp, but it functioned under a licensing agreement. By January 2008, the China site consisted of around 25 employees, as well as 80 guides who were responsible for article production within seven categories: Fashion, Food, Health, Hobbies, Pets, Digital, and Travel. As part of the localization process, the China initiative—led by Matt Roberts, who became the CEO of Abang.com, and Wen-Wei Wang, the vice president of technology for the launch—was named "Abang" because the Chinese character "bang" refers to the concept of a group or community.

The About Group generated US$102.7 million in 2007, which represented a 135-percent increase from the time of the Times Co. acquisition. Meyer stepped down from the chief executive role in March 2008 and was replaced by Cella Irvine, who previously worked for Hearst Corp. and Microsoft Corp. In April 2011, Irvine launched the About en Español website, which was About's first-ever Spanish-language channel and initially featured nine topics, including movies and makeup, that were to be expanded by around 100 by the start of 2012. The launch was part of an overall strategy that included a redesigned About.com homepage, a doubling of the number of "how-to" and do-it-yourself videos on About.com's 24 channels, and new outlets on About.com for advertisers.

The significant impact of the global financial crisis upon online advertising was experienced shortly after Irvine's appointment and, despite her focus on video content and Hispanic consumers, she was removed from the CEO role after three years and three consecutive quarters in which revenue decreased. Martin Nisenholtz, SVP of digital operations, temporarily replaced Irvine following her departure in May 2011.

In July 2011, Darline Jean was named CEO of the About Group, after the company's second-quarter revenues totaled US$27.8 million. Jean previously served as About's chief financial officer (CFO) and was promoted on September 1, 2011.

2012–2017: IAC acquisition, Neil Vogel appointment, relaunch
A media report published in August 2012 indicated that Answers.com had reached a preliminary agreement to acquire About.com for US$270 million. However, on August 26, Barry Diller's IAC announced that it would acquire About.com instead for US$300 million in cash. A source for TechCrunch later confirmed that Answers.com's offer was reportedly valued at US$270 million, but consisted of debt and equity in Answers.com.

In the corresponding press release, IAC explained that the acquisition would help bolster and accompany its existing properties, such as the Ask.com web search engine. Jean fulfilled her role as chief executive during the transition period, while ownership was transferred to IAC, and then left About shortly after the sale was finalized. At the time of the IAC acquisition, which was signed on August 26, 2012, About.com consisted of nearly 1,000 topic sites and over three million unique articles, while, in traffic terms, Alexa ranked the site as number 37 in the U.S. and 80 in the global context.

On April 2, 2013, Neil Vogel became the new CEO of About.com. Up until March 2003, Vogel was a key executive member of the marketing and media company Alloy Inc., a role that he left to cofound the Recognition Media marketing business that is responsible for producing the annual Webby Award event, as well as the Internet Week NY and Europe events. Vogel was selected by Business Insider for its 2012 "The Coolest People In New York Tech This Year" list, for his work as a venture partner of FirstMark Capital. , About.com was receiving about 84 million unique monthly visitors.

Following his appointment, Vogel's overall plan for About focused on social, mobile, and user experience, with an emphasis on increasing the amount of time that users remain on the site, rather than attracting people in the first instance. Vogel also stressed the importance of monetization in his numerous post-appointment interviews and he included a summary of About's revenue model as part of his discussion of the future with Bloomberg:

[We make money] one way, in general: we're advertising-supported. And that's monetized two ways: we do a lot of display advertising, and we do a lot of people clicking on links that we get paid for from Google and from others ... If we have all this traffic, and we have all this content, if we can make people engage content more, and spend more time here [About.com], and do more things, we're going to have more page views and much more of an opportunity to monetize About.

Vogel further explained that IAC has been able to create "compelling" content that manages to successfully engage Internet users, while About's content, in particular, is favored by the Google search engine. Furthermore, Vogel stated that native advertising is a marketing initiative that he would like to explore with caution, as "it's a really big opportunity to let marketers talk to our audience in the voice that they're already comfortable with."

In April 2014, Vogel revealed to the media that the About.com team had grown from 100 employees to 176, and the number of site contributors had increased by 20 percent. In terms of the website, the company's developers updated the backend technology so that it is capable of handling a greater degree of interactivity at the front end, while a major emphasis was placed on responsive web design, as the traffic from mobile devices and tablets was measured at nearly 40 percent.

The About.com website was relaunched in September 2014, following a significant redesign that expanded upon the new homepage that debuted in July 2014. Based on an analysis of the needs of both users and advertisers, the redesign sought to create an improved user experience and facilitate social sharing, including the addition of social media buttons that were not featured at the time of Vogel's appointment.

2017–present: rebranding to Dotdash and merger with Meredith

On May 2, 2017, IAC announced that they had renamed About.com to Dotdash, after about a year of transition. CEO Neil Vogel said that the company had lost mind share and needed to change their marketing strategy. According to WIRED, About.com was done away with despite its profitability, in order to make way for a new business model. The company refocused on vertical markets through niche websites it has: The Balance (personal finance), Lifewire (tech), The Spruce (home and food), VeryWell (health), TripSavvy (travel), and ThoughtCo (education).

On March 29, 2018, Dotdash won Digiday's Publisher of the Year. In July of the same year, Investopedia joined the Dotdash family of brands. On October 15, TripSavvy launched the Editors' Choice Awards.

On January 8, 2019, Dotdash announced the acquisition of Byrdie (beauty) and MyDomaine (women's lifestyle) from Clique Brands. On May 15, Dotdash announced the acquisition of Brides from Conde Nast. In the spring of 2019, Dotdash's home site, The Spruce, announced the launch of their first-ever paint collection, The Spruce Best Home, in partnership with KILZ and sold exclusively on Amazon. On October 1, Dotdash announced the acquisition of Liquor.com.

On February 4, 2020, Dotdash announced the acquisition of TreeHugger and Mother Nature Network. In June, Dotdash was named Digiday's Publisher of the Year in Digiday's Media Awards 2020. The Spruce won for Best User Experience and CEO Neil Vogel won Executive of the Year. On September 22, Dotdash announced that it acquired Simply Recipes and Serious Eats from Fexy Media.

On October 6, 2021, Dotdash announced the acquisition of Meredith's magazine and other non-broadcast assets (including the former Time Inc. assets) for $2.7 billion, forming a new entity called Dotdash Meredith. The transaction was finalized on December 1. On February 9, 2022, Dotdash CEO Neil Vogel issued a memo revealing that six former Meredith Corporation magazines (Entertainment Weekly, InStyle, EatingWell, Health, Parents, and People en Español) would cease having print circulation and switch to a digital-only format.

References

External links

Companies based in New York City
Digital mass media companies
English-language websites
IAC (company)
Internet properties established in 1997
Knowledge markets
Online mass media companies of the United States